This is a list of American truck manufacturers.

0-9
 4 Guys, Inc

A

 AEERSA (ambulances, rescue vehicles, fire trucks, 2000–present)
 Ace (1918–1927; also Busses)
 Alden Sampson
 Alexis Fire Equipment Company (fire trucks, 1947–present)
 Alkane
 Allianz
 AM General
 American (1911–1913)
 American Austin (1929–1934)
 American Bantam (1935–1941)
 American Coleman
 American LaFrance (fire trucks)
 American Truck Company - ATC (2004–2007)
 American & British Manufacturing Corporation (fire trucks, ?–1919)
 Athey
 Atterbury (1910-1935)
 Autocar
 Available (1910–1957)

B
 BAE Systems
 Bailey
 Barley
 Beck
 Bendix
 Bering
 Bessemer (1911–1926)
 Bethlehem (1917–1926)
 Biederman (1920–1955)
 Binghamton Electric (1920)
 Blair (1911–1918)
 Bourne (1915–1919)
 Brockway
 Brodesser (1909–1911)
 Brown
 Bryan (1918–1923)
 Buick
 BYD (garbage trucks) (different models in USA)

C

 Capacity 
 Caterpillar
 Chase (1907–1919)
 Chevrolet
 Chrysler
 Cline
 Clydesdale Motor Truck Company (1917–1939), formerly Clyde Cars Company
 Colet
 Commercial Truck Company of America defunct
 Corbitt
 Crane Carrier(CCC) 
 Crown

D
 Dart (1903–1988)
 Dempster
 Desberon (1901–1904)
 DeSoto (fire trucks)
 Diamond REO (1967–2013)
 Diamond T (1911–1966)
 Divco
 Dodge
 Duplex (1916–1955)

E
 E-One
 Eagle
 Elgin
 Elk (1913–1914)
 Envirotech
 Euclid

F
 Fageol Motors (1916–1938; later Peterbilt)
 Fargo
 Farrar Fire Apparatus (1933–1987)
 Federal
 Fisher
 Ford
 Freightliner
 FWD

G
 Garford
 Garwood
 General Vehicle (or G.V.) (1905–1906)
 Gersix (1915–1922)
 Global
 GMC (1912–present)
 Grabowsky (1908–1913)
 Graham-Paige

H
 Hart-Kraft (1907–1913)
 Harsco
 Harvey (1911–1932)
 Hatfield (1910–1911)
 Hayes (1922–1975)
 Hebb (before 1926)
 Heil
 Hendrickson
 HME
 Hummer

I

 Ibex
 Imperium
 Indiana
 International
 International Power Company (1899–1902)

J

 Jaguar
 Jeep
 Johnson

K

 Kaiser
 Kaiser-Frazer
 Kaiser-Jeep
 Kelland Electric (1922–1925), Newark, New Jersey
 Kalmar
 Kelly-Springfield (1910–1927)
 Kentucky Wagon Works (1914–1923)
 Kenworth (1923–present)
 Kimble
 Kissel (1910–1930)
 Kleiber (San Francisco)
 KME Fire Apparatus (1946–present)
 Krebs Commercial Car Company (1912–1917)

L
 Lange Motor Truck (1911–1931)
 Lehigh (1925–1927)
 Lincoln
 Lincoln Motor Truck Company
 Lion (garbage trucks)
 Lodal (garbage trucks and fire trucks)
 Luedinghaus (1920–1933)

M
 Maccar (1914–1935)
 Mack (1890–present)
 Marion (garbage trucks)
 Marmon (1963–1997)
 Marmon-Herrington (1931–1964)
 Maxim Motors
 McNeilus
 Menominee (1911–1937)
 Mercury
 Mogul (before 1926)
 Moreland (1911–1940)
 Motiv

N
 Navistar International (1986–present)
 Nikola (2016–present)

O
 O-K Truck (1916–1927)
 O.K. Motor Truck Company (?–1916) merged into Lincoln Motor Truck Company in 1916
 Old Hickory (1914–1923)
 Oldsmobile
 Oneida
 Orange EV
 Oshkosh (1918–present) (Wisconsin Duplex 1917-1918)
 Ottawa Trucks

P

 P&H
 PACCAR
 Pacific Truck & Trailer Limited (1947–1991)
 Packard (1904–1923)
 Pak-Mor (garbage trucks, San Antonio)
 Palmer-Moore (1906–1918)
 Peterbilt (1939–present)
 Pierce (1955–) (distinct from Pierce-Arrow)
 Pierce-Arrow (1911–c. 1934)
 Piggins Practical (1911–1916)
 Plymouth (1935–1941)
 Poss (1911–1912)

R
 Rapid (1902–1909) predecessor to GMC Truck
 REO (1908–1967) (maker of the REO Speed Wagon pickups and fire trucks)
 Republic (1913–1929) (later partnered with American LaFrance)
 Rush (1915–1918)

S
 Sanford-Herbert (1909–1939)
 Schacht (1910–1938) (fire trucks)
 Scot (1972-1980)
 Simon-Duplex (fire trucks)
 SPA
 Spartan
 Spencer Manufacturing (1986–) (fire trucks)
 Sterling
 Sternburg (1900–1916; later Sterling)
 Stewart & Stevenson
 Stoddard (1911)
 Studebaker (1905-1910 {electric}, 1913–1918, 1927–1964)

T
 Terex
 Tesla
 Thermo King
 Thor (Now XOS)
 Tico
 Tiffin (1913–1923)
 Traffic

U
 U.S. Hybrid

V
 V.E. (or V.E.C.) Electric (1901–1906)
 Van Dyke (1910–1912)
 Van-L (1912)
 Velie (1911–1929)
 Vestal (1914)

W

 Walter
 Wayne
 Western Star
 White
 White-Freightliner
 White-Gmc 
 White Hickory (1916–1921)
 White-Mustang
 White-Western Star 
 Willys
 Willys-Overland
 Wisconsin Duplex (1917–1918; Oshkosh Truck afterward)
 Worcester Lunch Car
 Workhorse

X
 XOS

Y
 Yellow

Z
 Zeligson

See also
 Dump truck
 List of automobile manufacturers
 List of defunct automobile manufacturers
 List of dump truck manufacturers
 List of truck manufacturers
 List of electric truck makers
 Semi-trailer and semi-trailer truck
 Tractor unit

Notes

References
Automobile Quarterly, (Editors of). The American Car Since 1775. New York: Automobile Quarterly Inc., 1971.
Clymer, Floyd. Treasury of Early American Automobiles, 1877-1925. New York: Bonanza Books, 1950.
Gunnell, John A. Standard Catalog of American Light-Duty Trucks 1896-1986 (Second Edition). Iola, WI: Krause Publications, 1993. 
Kimes, Beverly Rae, and Clark, Henry Austin, Jr. The Standard Catalog of American Cars 1805-1942 (3rd edition). Iola, WI: Krause Publications, 1996. 
Vossler, Bill. Cars, Trucks, and Buses Made By Tractor Companies. Iola, WI: Krause Publications, 1999. 

Truck Manufacturers
Manufacturers, American